György Guczoghy (born 3 March 1962) is a Hungarian gymnast. He was born in Budapest, and is married to Lenke Almási. He received an Olympic bronze medal in gymnastics in 1980. He has also won a bronze and a silver on pommel horse at the World championship. He was named Hungarian Sportsman of The Year in 1983.

In 2012, together with Katalin Makray, József Harmath and Antal Kisteleki, he was inducted to the Hungarian Gymnastics Hall of Fame.

References

External links

1962 births
Living people
Gymnasts from Budapest
Hungarian male artistic gymnasts
Olympic gymnasts of Hungary
Gymnasts at the 1980 Summer Olympics
Gymnasts at the 1988 Summer Olympics
Olympic bronze medalists for Hungary
Olympic medalists in gymnastics
Medalists at the 1980 Summer Olympics
European champions in gymnastics
20th-century Hungarian people